Cyclobutanetetrone, also called tetraoxocyclobutane, is an organic compound with formula C4O4 or (CO)4, the fourfold ketone of cyclobutane. It would be an oxide of carbon, indeed a tetramer of carbon monoxide.

The compound seems to be thermodynamically unstable.  As of 2000, it had yet to be synthesized in significant amounts but may have transient existence as detected by mass spectrometry.

Related compounds

Cyclobutanetetrone can be viewed as the neutral counterpart of the squarate anion , which is stable and has been known at least since 1959.

The compound octahydroxycyclobutane or cyclobutaneoctaol (C(OH)2)4 may be referred to in the literature as "hydrated tetraoxocyclobutane".

References

See also
 Cyclohexanehexone
 Cyclopentanepentone

Oxocarbons
Hypothetical chemical compounds
Cyclobutanes
Cyclic ketones
Conjugated ketones